The  is the prefectural police force responsible, under the control of the Aichi Prefectural Public Safety Commission, for policing Aichi Prefecture.

History
Its origins date back to 1871 (Meiji 4), when its predecessor organisation, the Aichi Prefectural Police Department was founded. The Aichi Prefectural Police Department was under the control of the Police Bureau of the Empire of Japan's Home Ministry from 1873 to 1947, when the Diet of Japan passed the Police Act 1947 during Allied occupation. After this, the newly organised National Rural Police took over policing the Aichi prefecture. After further reform of the Police Act in 1954, local police forces were organised by prefecture and made independent under the monitoring and guidance of the National Police Agency, and the current Aichi Prefectural Police was created. Further centralisation efforts led to the merging of the Nagoya City Police in to the Aichi Prefectural Police in July 1955.

Uniquely, the Aichi Prefectural Police operated a prefecture-wide fingerprinting scheme from 1955 to 1970. Aichi was the only prefecture in Japan to do so. Under the scheme, all school leavers were required to give all ten of their fingerprints to the police. The purpose of collecting fingerprint data was officially to assist in identifying accident victims. During the programme, there were over 2 million prints registered. However, in 1970, after an unidentified body was found in the neighbouring Nagano prefecture, it was discovered that Nagano's police force had been given access to Aichi's fingerprint data. Privacy concerns were raised at the prefectural assembly, and the scheme was abolished as a result.

Organisation
The Aichi Prefectural Police is under the command of a Senior Commissioner and reports directly to the Aichi Prefectural Public Safety Commission.

Recent events
In 2005, Chubu Centrair International Airport opened in Tokoname. As a result, the English 'POLICE' was added to the sides of police vehicles.

On 17 May 2007, a member of the Aichi Prefectural Police Special Assault Team was killed in Nagakute after a man took his ex-wife hostage. During the 29 hour standoff, the police lieutenant was shot in the neck while approaching the perpetrator when a dog barked, alerting him to the lieutenant's presence. According to the investigation report, it would be another five hours before he could be rescued, and by then, he could no longer be saved. The report recommended that bulletproof vests be more widely provided and that better sniper support be given in such situations.

Scandals
In July 2012, an Aichi police sergeant was arrested after being found with an illegal handgun and counterfeit currency in his car.
On 19 September 2013, a Detective Chief Inspector was arrested on suspicion of leaking investigation information to the Kodo-kai.
On 17 September 2014, several items of collected evidence were found dumped in the mountains near Seto City. Aichi Prefectural Police suspected that officers involved in the case intentionally disposed of the evidence. 
On 23 June 2015, a vehicle belonging to the Criminal Investigation Department's international investigation unit collided with a student on a bicycle in Chiba prefecture. The student was severely injured.
On 4 December 2022, Man left naked, bound, with head in toilet bowl was found dead in police custody.

Gallery

References

Prefectural police of Japan
Aichi Prefecture
Chūbu region
1871 establishments in Japan